West Bird's Head languages are a small family of poorly documented Papuan languages spoken on the Bird's Head Peninsula of New Guinea.

The West Bird's Head (WBH) family is a well-defined family of six languages spoken at the western end of the Bird's Head Peninsula of New Guinea and the eastern part of the island of Salawati opposite the Bird's Head's western shore. Based on pronominal evidence, they appear to be related to the North Halmahera languages of North Maluku.

Language contact
West Bird's Head languages have been heavily influenced by Austronesian languages. Austronesian influence is evident in SVO word order (as opposed to SOV word order in most other Papuan language families), pronouns, numerals, and other typological features.

Languages
 Seget–Moi (Sele Strait): 
Seget
Moi
 South West Bird's Head (Seremuk River): 
Tehit (or Kaibus; the most populous, with 10,000 speakers)
Kalabra (close to Tehit)
Moraid 
 ? Kuwani

Kuwani is attested only from a single word list, but is clearly distinct.

These languages cannot be easily linked to other families of the Bird‘s Head Peninsula. They have been plausibly connected to the geographically close North Halmahera (NH) family, a relationship considered clear by Reesink 1998; however, the evidence does not appear to be conclusive. In particular, the available lexical evidence is flimsy, as noted by Holton and Klamer (2018). On the other hand, the geographical proximity of the two families lends credibility to this proposal. The connection between WBH and NH was first proposed by H.K.J. Cowan (1957), and further discussed by C.L. Voorhoeve (1987, 1994).

A link between WBH and the isolates Abun and Maybrat has also been proposed (Wichmann 2013, Flassy 2002).

Vocabulary comparison
The following basic vocabulary words are from Voorhoeve (1975), as cited in the Trans-New Guinea database:

{| class="wikitable sortable"
! gloss !! Kalabra !! Moi !! Moraid !! Seget !! Tehit
|-
! head
| safas || sawa || sawag || sadus || sam
|-
! hair
| sadin || sagin || sadie || salas || gen
|-
! eye
| sifoko || suo || sgolfun || si || tsifon
|-
! tooth
| tela || efek || etəla || gifek || -hek
|-
! leg
| terit || telek || ere || cek || ndeit
|-
! louse
| on || sayam || oŋ || wut || hain
|-
! dog
| houn || ofun || ŋouŋ || awfu || 
|-
! pig
| beak || baik || mimula || mon || 
|-
! bird
| kalen || kelem || kele || klem || klen
|-
! egg
| weko || tolok || begu || niwi || mesyen
|-
! blood
| hein || sdam || hijeg || sədam || hon
|-
! bone
| kodus || kodus || kedoq || nədus || honim
|-
! skin
| falak || -kesik || balg || nensiek || falek
|-
! tree
| kout || ouk || pelu || bua || molom
|-
! man
| nadele || (ne) dala || dli || nanla || naadla
|-
! sun
| pun || dewe || telu || tale || pun
|-
! water
| kala || kala || kəla || kla || sem
|-
! fire
| sal || yak || salp || yap || 
|-
! stone
| amak || kwak || amp || kuat || amak
|-
! name
| nakadi || kedi || numhamone || nomo || kendim
|-
! eat
| atkaren || wak || nagrimi || nate || atni
|-
! one
| mere || mele || merəh || məre || mre
|-
! two
| lap || ali || telok || ali || la; lauh
|}

References

 
Languages of western New Guinea
West and Central Bird's Head languages